Andrea De Marchi (born 29 May 1992) is an Italian rugby union player. His usual position is as a Flanker and he currently plays for Fiamme Oro in Top12.

In 2015–16 Pro12 season De Marchi played for Benetton Treviso.

In 2012 De Marchi was named in the Italy Under 20 squad.

References

External links 
It's Rugby England Profile
It's Rugby France Profile
ESPN Profile

Sportspeople from the Province of Rovigo
Italian rugby union players
1992 births
Living people
Rugby union flankers
People from Rovigo
Rugby Rovigo Delta players
Benetton Rugby players